Richards Nunatak is a large nunatak between McLea Nunatak and Pudding Butte in the Prince Albert Mountains, Oates Land. Mapped and named by the Southern Party of the New Zealand Geological Survey Antarctic Expedition (NZGSAE), 1962–63, for David Richards, radio operator at Scott Base, who shared field party work and was responsible for the training of the base dog team in the absence of the base dog handler.
 

Nunataks of Oates Land